Fasbender Clinic is a building in Hastings, Minnesota, United States, designed by Frank Lloyd Wright and constructed in 1957. It was listed on the National Register of Historic Places in 1979. It is just off Minnesota State Highway 55 at 801 Pine Street. It has a distinctive copper roof which extends almost to the ground around much of the exterior.

Notes and references

 Storrer, William Allin. The Frank Lloyd Wright Companion. University Of Chicago Press, 2006,  (S.424)

External links
 Exterior photographs of Fasbender Clinic
 Interior photographs of Fasbender Clinic

Buildings and structures in Hastings, Minnesota
Hospital buildings on the National Register of Historic Places in Minnesota
Frank Lloyd Wright buildings
National Register of Historic Places in Dakota County, Minnesota